Ceropegia rhynchantha is a species of plants in the family Apocynaceae. It occurs in West Africa and has slender flowers, with basal inflation and slight expansion of the tube towards the mouth, as well as relatively long, narrow lobes.

References 

Plants described in 1913
rhynchantha